Ondina elachisinoides is a species of sea snail, a marine gastropod mollusk in the family Pyramidellidae, the pyrams and their allies.

Description
The shell reaches a length of  4 mm.

Distribution
This marine species occurs off the Philippines.

References

 Hori (1999), New Species of the Pyramidellidae (Orthogastropoda: Heterobranchia) from the Collections of the Yamaguchi Museum and the Hagi City Museum, Japanese Journal of Malacology, Vol.58; #4;Page.175-190;

External links
 To Encyclopedia of Life
 To World Register of Marine Species

Pyramidellidae
Gastropods described in 1999